The foreign relations of Guinea, including those with its West African neighbors, have improved steadily since 1985.

Diplomatic history 
Guinea re-established relations with France and West Germany in 1975, and with neighboring Ivory Coast and Senegal in 1978. Guinea has been active in efforts toward regional integration and cooperation, especially regarding the Organisation of African Unity and the Economic Community of West African States (ECOWAS).

Guinea has participated in both diplomatic and military efforts to resolve conflicts in Liberia, Sierra Leone, and Guinea-Bissau, and contributed contingents of troops to peacekeeping operations in all three countries as part of ECOMOG, the Military Observer Group of ECOWAS. In the 1990s, Guinea hosted almost a million refugees fleeing the civil wars in Sierra Leone and Liberia. As of 2004, Guinea maintained a policy of unrestricted admission to refugees.

Guinea is also a member of the International Criminal Court with a Bilateral Immunity Agreement of protection for the United States military (as covered under Article 98).

2009 ambassador recall 
On 5 May 2009, President Moussa Dadis Camara, who seized power in a bloodless coup which followed the 22 December 2008 death of President Lansana Conté, announced the recall of 30 of Guinea's ambassadors to other countries.  The order was made by a presidential decree on state television and was the first major diplomatic move made by the new leader.

The decision affected ambassadors to the United States, South Korea, the People's Republic of China, France, the United Kingdom, Russia, Egypt, South Africa, Italy, Japan, Brazil, Cuba, Switzerland, Serbia, Malaysia, Iran, the United Arab Emirates, Senegal, Nigeria, Libya, Ghana, Algeria, Morocco, Gabon, Liberia, Sierra Leone and Guinea-Bissau, comprising almost all of Guinea's foreign embassies.  The Guinean representatives to the European Union, the United Nations and the African Union were also affected.

No reason was stated for the recall. The Tocqueville Connection states: "Most of the ambassadors were appointed by former prime minister Lansana Kouyaté, in office from February 2007 until May 2008," raising the possibility that the recall was an attempt on the part of Camara to distance himself from the previous government.

In late March 2009, the Guinean ambassador to Serbia faced expulsion for personal involvement in cigarette smuggling (1,000 packs of cigarettes were found in his BMW) but avoided arrest due to diplomatic immunity (although he was declared as persona non grata).

2021 coup d'etat
The September 5, 2021 coup d'etat brought swift condemnation and threats of sanctions from the United Nations, the African Union, the West African regional bloc ECOWAS (which suspended Guinea), and close allies of Guinea—as well as the United States—among others. China, uncharacteristically, also openly opposed the coup.

Bilateral relations

See also
List of diplomatic missions in Guinea
List of diplomatic missions of Guinea

References